José María Robles Fraga (born 10 April 1956) is a Spanish politician and diplomat who represented Córdoba in the Congress of Deputies from 1993 to 2001.

He has served as ambassador to Russia, Pakistan, and Lithuania, among other destinations.

Family
He was born in Bogotá in 1956. His father Carlos Robles Piquer and uncle Manuel Fraga Iribarne were also politicians.

Other activities
 European Council on Foreign Relations (ECFR), Member

Decorations 

 Grand Cross of Aeronautical Merit, white decoration (2021)

References

1956 births
Living people
People's Party (Spain) politicians
Members of the 5th Congress of Deputies (Spain)
Members of the 6th Congress of Deputies (Spain)
Members of the 7th Congress of Deputies (Spain)
Ambassadors of Spain to Lithuania
Ambassadors of Spain to Russia
Ambassadors of Spain to Pakistan